Durrell is a surname.

Durrell may also refer to:

 Durrell, Newfoundland and Labrador, Canada
 Durrell Institute of Conservation and Ecology, a subdivision and research institute of the Department of Anthropology at the University of Kent
 Durrell Wildlife Conservation Trust, a conservation organisation
 Durrell Wildlife Park a wildlife park owned by Durrell Wildlife Conservation Trust

See also

 Durell (disambiguation)